Gloria Kisch (1941–2014) was an American artist and sculptor known especially for her early post-Minimalist paintings and wall sculptures, and her later large-scale work in metal.

Early life and education 
Born in New York City in 1941 to the German immigrants Max and Hilda Stern, Gloria initially completed an undergraduate degree at Sarah Lawrence College in 1963, before leaving for California, where she would spend the next two and a half decades of her life.

Time in California 
In 1963, Kisch enrolled at the Otis College of Art and Design, Los Angeles, where she studied alongside artists such as Bas Jan Ader and Barry Le Va, earning a BFA and completing her MFA in 1969. While at Otis she embarked on a series of hard-edge paintings, described by the critic Naomi Baker in the San Diego Evening Tribune as "geometric paintings, vivid and sharply defined with color areas and shapes." 
 
Beginning in 1971, while living in Venice Beach, Kisch's work became increasingly sculptural, described by the critic Melinda Terbell Wortz in Artweek in 1974 as "more like wall sculptures than paintings." Her early sculptures were observed to be in a post-Minimalist vein and were compared to works by her contemporaries Eva Hesse and Bruce Nauman, as well as the modernist pioneer sculptor, Constantin Brancusi.

In 1973, Kisch began exhibiting at the newly founded cooperative gallery Womanspace in the exhibitions Open Invitational and Female Sexuality. That same year, Suzanne Saxe Gallery in San Francisco gave Kisch a solo exhibition, the first in which she was able to display a group of sculptural works. She also debuted Sand Sculpture at the Newport Harbor Art Museum (now the Orange County Museum of Art). She began showing regularly at Cirrus gallery, as well as at various colleges and universities in California. In 1976, she had her first international solo show in Paris at Stevenson Palluel and was a participant in the Biennale of Sydney.

In the late 1970s Kisch was involved with the Woman's Building, which was founded by Judy Chicago at Otis College, where in 1977 she led an extension program in sculpture.

In 1978 she was included in a landmark group exhibition organized by Southern Exposure at San Francisco's Stephen Wirtz Gallery. Among the other artists shown were John McCracken, Judy Chicago, Bruce Nauman, Ed Ruscha, Kenneth Price, Richard Diebenkorn, and Edward Kienholz. That same year, her work was also exhibited at the Los Angeles Institute of Contemporary Art in the exhibition Current Directions in Southern Californian Art. She had her first New York solo show, of The Chimes Series (originally presented at Janus Gallery in Venice, California) at the Touchstone Gallery in 1979.

Her work was reviewed in Artforum multiple times in the 1970s, including a November 1974 article in which Peter Frank compared her work to Alberto Giacometti's, and a February 1978 review by Frank of her 1977 solo exhibition at Cirrus Gallery.

In 1980 she had a small solo exhibition at New York's Institute for Art and Urban Resources, P.S.1 (now MoMA PS1).

Return to New York 
In 1981, Kisch returned to New York City, working briefly on Leonard Street before relocating to Broadway, where she was among the artists moving into converted Soho lofts. She built a studio on the first floor "because of the need to use heavy and bulky material." This same year, The Milwaukee Art Museum exhibited The Leonard Street Series, a group of sixteen large drawings made in oil stick and white gesso. The Milwaukee Journal reports Kisch as saying of the series that "the drawing developed because of my passion for New York, rather than my passion for drawing."

Following, in 1983 Kisch presented The Gateway Series at the Queens Museum and at 55 Mercer Street.

In the late 1980s, as she increasingly worked primarily in metal, Kisch embarked on "functional sculptures," objects and furnishings that blurred the line between art and design. They were exhibited at the Soho gallery Art et Industrie and later at the Bernice Steinbaum and Vered galleries. In the East Hampton Star, Rose C.S. Slivka wrote of the work that "There is no question but that Gloria Kisch, a Bridgehampton sculptor, has invented a whole new genre of furniture utility" and Suzanne Slesin stated in The New York Times that "There was a time when Ms. Kisch's imaginative, finely crafted sculpture posed difficulties, because it was often functional and thus challenged the conventional category definitions of art."

Kisch was included along with artists such as David Hare and Donald Lipski in the 1988 exhibition The Legacy of Surrealism in Contemporary Art at the Ben Shahn Galleries at William Paterson College.

In 1991, Kisch began residing on Long Island. In 2000, she founded a 40-acre personal studio with metalworking and welding workshops in Flanders, Riverhead, Long Island that she called Three Ponds. She worked prolifically at Three Ponds until her death in 2014.

Kisch was included in the 1993 exhibition Art and Application at Turbulence Gallery in New York along with artists such as Vito Acconci, John Chamberlain, Richard Artschwager, Dennis Oppenheim, and Haim Steinbach. The following year, the Los Angeles County Museum of Art acquired Kisch's 1977 lithograph The Right Place to present in the 1995 exhibition Made in LA: The Prints of Cirrus Editions, along with works by John Baldessari, Vija Clemins, Charles Christopher Hill, Jay McCafferty, and Eugene Sturman.

In 2007, she had a notable two-person show with sculptor Dale Chihuly at the Vered Gallery in East Hampton, NY, where she exhibited her Flowers series. In 2009, American Image Books published the book Gloria Kisch: Fusion of Opposites, showcasing her sculptural work and in 2010 she presented a solo exhibition at Guild Hall in East Hampton, NY.

Public art 
Kisch's large scale sculptural work also lent itself to public installation. In 1978 she exhibited as part of Sculpture '78 at the Civic Center Mall. A year later, she also showed publicly as part of the exhibition 10-15 at Cal State San Bernardino.

In 1987 her sculpture Big Apple Christmas Tree was installed in the Robert Moses Plaza at Lincoln Center. Her monumental sculpture Octopus II was exhibited in 2002 in Dag Hammarskjold Plaza, followed by a presentation of her sculpture Copper Fusion in 2010–11; both installations were organized by the City of New York and the Department of Parks and Recreation.

Kisch's views on art 
Throughout her life, Kisch traveled and read widely, and was inspired by various cultural traditions. As she stated to Barbara Wilson in an interview in Current Magazine in 1975–76: "I'm interested in the esthetic quality of eternal timelessness, in ancient art—Greek, Egyptian, and Indian—that seems never outdated." Her work was variously described by critics as "totemic," "suggest[ing] the powerful presence of primitive ritualistic objects," "suggest[ing] unknown fetishistic rituals," and "like sober cult objects."

She professed an interest in the power of art as healing, saying she was "interested in creating a magical presence which has curing properties." Her daughter, Rhona Kisch, also reported that "Gloria was drawn to the way these cultures used art to heal and embody the power of intimate relationships."

As Kisch said in La Mamelle in summer 1975: "For a society which has lost its connection with the reasons for human existence, Art serves to reinstate what is important. In a society which often reverses the important and irrelevant, Art acts as a reminder of eternal values which have served mankind always. Therefore, Art today acts as a curing agent. When we are convinced by Art our values are set straight again. Art cures by reinforcing the importance of our individual songs."

Personal life 
Kisch had two children, Rhona and Theo, and two grandchildren.

Posthumous reception 
Following Kisch's death in 2014, there has been renewed interest in her work. A catalogue of her metal flower sculptures, Immortal Flowers, was published by dieFirma and bookdummypress in 2019 in conjunction with an exhibition of her work at dieFirma's New York gallery.

Public collections 
Kisch's work now resides in the collections of many institutions in the U.S. and abroad:

Virginia Museum of Fine Arts, Richmond, Virginia

Los Angeles County Museum of Art, Los Angeles, California

Newport Harbor Art Museum, Newport Beach, California

Milwaukee Art Museum, Milwaukee, Wisconsin

Palm Springs Art Museum, Palm Springs, California

Aldrich Museum of Contemporary Art, Ridgefield, Connecticut

Otis Art Institute, Los Angeles, California

Downey Museum Of Art, Downey, California

Centrum Sztuki Współczesnej, Warsaw, Poland

Neuberger Museum, Purchase, New York

Bergen Museum of Art, Paramus, New Jersey

Mildura Arts Centre, Mildura, Australia

Denver Art Museum, Denver, Colorado

San Angelo Museum of Fine Arts, San Angelo, Texas

References

1941 births
2014 deaths
American women painters
American women sculptors
20th-century American painters
20th-century American sculptors
20th-century American women artists
21st-century American painters
21st-century American sculptors
21st-century American women artists
Painters from New York City
Sculptors from New York (state)
Sarah Lawrence College alumni
Otis College of Art and Design alumni